Allsvenskan 1997, part of the 1997 Swedish football season, was the 73rd Allsvenskan season played. Halmstads BK won the league ahead of runners-up IFK Göteborg, while Västerås SK, Degerfors IF and Panos Ljungskile SK were relegated.

League table

Relegation play-offs 

Östers IF won 3–1 on aggregate.

BK Häcken won 5–3 on aggregate.

Results

Season statistics

Top scorers

References 

Print
 
 
 

Online
 
 

Allsvenskan seasons
Swed
Swed
1